Toxic Bunny is a side-scrolling action platform game for DOS computers released in 1996 by Celestial Games. The premise of the game is that a bunny named Toxic, a coffee guzzling, gun slinging maniac who is having a really bad day. The game covers four large levels in which Toxic hunts the person (or animal) responsible for interrupting his coffee break, brainwashing all his friends, and covering the planet with a decaffeinated goo. Within the game you can use any number of incredibly large weapons including a Nitric Hamster Launcher, while squashing aliens with rusty nautical equipment.

The game has been called a psychedelic parody of Epic Games character, Jazz Jackrabbit.

References

1996 video games
Windows games
DOS games
Platform games
Video games about rabbits and hares
Video games developed in South Africa